Carl Juel (22 June 1706 – 1 September 1767), was a Danish statesman and court official, councillor, and diocesan governor.

Personal life 
Carl Juel was born on 22 June 1706 in Copenhagen. He was the son of statesman and nobleman Knud Juel (1665–1709) and Christine Elisabeth Knuth (1675–1738). His older brother, Niels Juel (1696–1766), was a court official.

Juel was married three times. He married Christiane Henriette Louise von Schleinitz on 15 August 1738. She died on 12 August 1756. On 24 March 1759, he married Anna Margrethe Juel (1741–1761). He was married for the third time on 24 March 1762, to Amalie Christiane von Råben (1736–1803). Juel is known to have had at least two sons with Amalie, the eldest of which was born on 7 April 1765 and either named Niels or Frederik. His younger son, Knud Frederik Juel, was born on 6 December 1766.

In 1755, Juel purchased Rønnebæksholm. He himself rarely stayed at the estate, and instead had it administered by an estate manager. He sold the property in 1761. After his brother Niels died in 1766, he inherited Valdemar's Castle, which had been in the family since 1678. Juel died on 1 September 1767 in at Odense Palace. He is buried at Bregninge Kirke on Tåsinge.

Career 
He served as courtier to the queen, Sophie Magdalene of Brandenburg-Kulmbach, and he married the queen's maid-of-honor Christiane Henriette Louise von Schleinitz in 1738. He was appointed as the Diocesan Governor of Christianssand stiftamt in Norway from 1738 until 1742. They then moved back to Denmark where he and his wife were powerful central figures at the Danish royal court and their careers there took place in parallel: in 1742–43 they served as chamberlain and chief lady-in-waiting to Princess Louise of Denmark, and in 1743 they were appointed to the same position for the new crown princess, Louise of Great Britain. They kept their offices to Louise after she became queen, and were appointed to the same offices to the next queen, Juliana Maria of Brunswick-Wolfenbüttel, in 1752.

In 1754, the Juel couple were ousted from the royal court, reportedly because they were considered a threat by the powerful Johann Hartwig Ernst von Bernstorff. He was then appointed to the position of County Governor of Ringsted amt. He held that post from 1754 until 1760 when he was appointed to the position of Diocesan Governor of Fyns stiftamt, a job which he held until his death in 1767.

References 

1706 births
1767 deaths
Danish courtiers
18th-century Danish politicians
Juel family